The Bigshoes Foundation is a non-governmental organisation based in Johannesburg, which provides medical goods and services to children in South Africa affected by HIV/AIDS.  Bigshoes operates three children's clinics weekly at the Memorial Institute for Child Health and the Baragwanath Hospital in Soweto, and also has active sites in Cape Town and Durban.

History
Bigshoes began when Dr. Michelle Meiring and Dr. Gayle Sherman founded the Children's Homes Outreach Medical Program (CHOMP) in 2002.  CHOMP started its work by addressing medical and social needs of children living in homes, but later adjusted the focus of their program towards orphaned children.  In 2003, with initial funding from the Rockefeller Brother's Fund, CHOMP evolved into BigShoes and expanded its goals to include orphaned and vulnerable children, and over the years a community outreach component was introduced.

It was reported that Bigshoes was closing down in December of 2012 following large losses due to fraud.

Goals
The Bigshoes Foundation focuses on several aspects of the pediatric HIV/AIDS problem in South Africa, with regards to providing care for orphaned, abandoned babies, establishment of medical clinics and outreach programs, pediatric palliative care, and the training of health care personnel to address this population of patients.

References

External links
Bigshoes Foundation website

Organizations established in 2002
Foundations based in South Africa
2002 establishments in South Africa